The 2013–14 Serbian SuperLiga (known as the Jelen SuperLiga for sponsorship reasons) was the eighth season of the Serbian SuperLiga since its establishment. The title was won by Red Star Belgrade.

Teams
A total of 16 teams will contest the league, including 13 sides from the 2012–13 season and two promoted from the 2012–13 Serbian First League, which are the champions FK Napredak Kruševac and second placed FK Čukarički. Few days before the start of the season Hajduk was dissolved, thus leaving an empty spot. 16th club was determined as FK Voždovac, 3rd of Serbian First League in 2012-13 season. At the end of the season, the last two teams will be relegated.

Stadiums and locations

All figures for stadiums include seating capacity only, as many stadiums in Serbia have stands without seats which would otherwise depict the actual number of people able to attend football matches not regulated by UEFA or FIFA.

Personnel and kits

Note: Flags indicate national team as has been defined under FIFA eligibility rules. Players and Managers may hold more than one non-FIFA nationality.

Nike is the official ball supplier for Serbian SuperLiga.

Transfers
For the list of transfers involving SuperLiga clubs during 2012–13 season, please see: List of Serbian football transfers summer 2013 and List of Serbian football transfers winter 2013-14.

League table

Results 
All clubs play each other twice, once at home and once away. Giving a total of 30 matches to be played per team.

Play-off

* Metalac refused to play second leg due to severe crowd disturbance in the first leg, caused by Rad fans.

Awards

Top goalscorers
Sources: Superliga official website, soccerway.com

Top assists
Sources: Superliga official website, soccerway.com

Hat-tricks

Team of the Season

References

External links
 Official website

Serbian SuperLiga seasons
1
Serbia